Bilstein may refer to:

People
 Counts of Bilstein, Frankish noble family
 Barons of Bilstein, Westphalian noble family

Inhabited places
 Bilstein (Kürten), village near Kürten, county of Rheinisch-Bergischer-Kreis, North Rhine-Westphalia
 Bilstein (Kreuzau), village near Kreuzau, county of Düren, North Rhine-Westphalia
 Bilstein (Lennestadt), town quarter of Lennestadt, county of Olpe, North Rhine-Westphalia
 Bilstein (Limbourg) or Bilstain, town quarter of Limbourg, Province of Liege, Region of Wallonia, Belgium
 Amt Bilstein, former administrative district in Westphalia
 Barony of Bilstein, medieval comital lordship in the area of Eschwege, North Hesse
 Villa Bilstein, Ennepetal, county of Ennepe-Ruhr-Kreis, North Rhine-Westphalia

Castles
 Bilstein Castle (Lennestadt), castle in Lennestadt, Landkreis county of Olpe, North Rhine-Westphalia
 Bilstein Castle (Eschwege), ruined castle near Eschwege, county of Werra-Meißner-Kreis, North Hesse
 Bilstein Castle (Bas-Rhin), ruined castle near Urbeis in the Alsace, department of Bas-Rhin
 Château de Bilstein, ruined castle near Riquewihr in the Alsace, department of Haut-Rhin

Geological formations
 Am Bilstein (Hückeswagen) (284,7 m), near Dürhagen, county of Oberbergischer Kreis, North Rhine-Westphalia
 Bilstein (Brilon Plateau) (620,1 m), on the Brilon Plateau, Hochsauerlandkreis, North Rhine-Westphalia
 Bilstein (Kaufungen Forest) (641,2 m), in the Kaufungen Forest, county of Werra-Meißner, North Hesse
 Bilstein (Langenberge) (ca. 460 m), in the Langenberge, Schwalm-Eder Kreis, North Hesse
 Bilstein (Vogelsberg) (665,5 m), in the Vogelsberg, Vogelsbergkreis, Middle Hessse
 Bilstein Cave, in the municipality of Warstein, county of Soest, North Rhine-Westphalia
 Bilstein (Wolfhagen) (405,1 m), on the Isthaberg near Wolfhagen-Istha, county of Kassel, North Hesse

Other uses
 Bilstein & Siekermann, component manufacturer with head office in Hillesheim
 Ferdinand Bilstein, car supplier with head office in Ennepetal
 ThyssenKrupp Bilstein, shock absorber manufacturer with head office in Ennepetal
 Bilstein-Gruppe, international steel company with head office in Hagen-Hohenlimburg

See also
 Bielstein
 Bildstein